Marjorie Olive Whitaker, née Taylor (23 September 1895, Bradford – 7 January 1976, Skipton), better known under her pseudonym Malachi Whitaker, was an English writer, noted for her short stories and an autobiography. She wrote nearly 100 stories published in four collections by Jonathan Cape in the 1920s and 1930s. Her talent was recognized by contemporaries: Vita Sackville-West compared her to Katherine Mansfield, and she was known as the 'Bradford Chekhov'. Following the publication of her memoir And so did I in 1939, she announced her retirement from writing.

Biography
Whitaker was born in 1895 in Bradford, the eighth of eleven children. She left school when she was 13, and worked for her father writing greeting cards for his bookbinding works. She married Leonard Whitaker in 1917, and the couple adopted two children.

Works 
Short Stories
 Frost in April (1929)
 No Luggage? (1930)
 Five for Silver (1932)
 Honeymoon and Other Stories (1934)
 Selected Stories (1946)
 The Crystal Fountain and Other Stories (1984)
 The Journey Home and Other Stories (2017)

Memoirs
 And so did I (1939)

Humor
 The Autobiography of Ethel Firebrace (1937) (written pseudonymously with Gay Taylor)

References
Notes

Sources
'Malachi Whitaker: Writer of short stories', The Times, 27 January 1976

1895 births
1976 deaths
English short story writers
English memoirists
British women short story writers
British women memoirists
Pseudonymous women writers
20th-century English writers
20th-century pseudonymous writers